Bojdan (also known as Bozhdan, Bojdan-e-Kūchak, and Bojdān Kūchek) is a village in Beyhaq Rural District, Sheshtomad District, Sabzevar County, Razavi Khorasan Province, Iran. At the 2006 census, its population was 711, in 189 families.

References 

Populated places in Sabzevar County